A propeller is a mechanical device that converts rotational motion into thrust.

Propeller may also refer to:
 Propeller (aeronautics)

Music
 Propeller Records, a record label
 Propeller (band), an Estonian punk band
 Propellers (band), an English band
 Propeller (Guided by Voices album) (1992)
 Propeller (Peter Stuart album) (2002)

Other uses
 Propeller (theatre company), a UK theatre group
 Propeller TV, a British television channel
 Propeller.com, a social news website operated by AOL
 Parallax Propeller, a microcontroller
Propeller Knight, a boss in Shovel Knight

See also
 Beta-propeller, a protein fold